Meloidogyne naasi, the barley root-knot nematode or cereal root-knot nematode, is a plant pathogenic nematode, and also an invasive species. The nematode occurs as the primary root-knot pathogen on golf courses and turf in the Northeast United States, although it is unclear as to whether the pathogen is native or introduced. In 2019 it was reported damaging cereal and grass crops in Northern Ireland.

See also 
 List of barley diseases
 List of oat diseases

References

External links 
 Nemaplex, University of California - Meloidogyne naasi
 Invasive.org - Meloidogyne naasi

Tylenchida
Agricultural pest nematodes
Barley diseases
Oats diseases
Nematodes described in 1965